Tami is an Austronesian language on the Tami Islands and in a few villages at the tip of the Huon Peninsula in Morobe Province, Papua New Guinea. It is not closely related to the other Huon Gulf languages, but like other North New Guinea languages in Morobe Province, its basic word order is subject–verb–object (SVO).

Phonology
Tami distinguishes five vowels (i, e, a, o, u) and the following consonants (Colich 1995). Voiced obstruents do not occur in syllable-final position, while glottal stop only occurs at the end of a syllable.

Numerals
Traditional Tami counting practices begin with the fingers of the hands, then continue on the feet to reach twenty, which translates as 'whole person'. Higher numbers are multiples of 'whole person'. Nowadays, most counting above five is done in Tok Pisin. An alternate form of the numeral 'one', functions as an indefinite article. Distributive numerals are formed via reduplication:  'two by two',  'three by three' and so forth (Bamler 1900:204).

References
 Bamler, G. (1900).   5: 198–253.
 Colich, Kim (1995). Tami organized phonology data. Ukarumpa: SIL.

External links
 Paradisec has two collections of Arthur Cappell's materials (AC1, AC2) and one collection of Malcolm Ross's (MR1) that include Sobei language materials.

Footnotes 

Ngero–Vitiaz languages
Languages of Morobe Province